Igreja de Santa Clara may refer to:

 Igreja de Santa Clara (Porto), a church in Portugal
 Igreja de Santa Clara (Santarém), a church in Portugal